Persepolis 15 Khordad Varamin Football Club is an Iranian football club based in Varamin, Iran. They currently compete in the 2011–12 Iran Football's 2nd Division.

History

Establishment
The club was originally known as Ashian Gostar Varamin, competing in the 2nd Division since the 2010–11 season. In the 2012–13 they were renamed to Persepolis 15 Khordad Varamin.

Season-by-Season

The table below shows the achievements of the club in various competitions.

See also
 2011-12 Hazfi Cup
 2011–12 Iran Football's 2nd Division

Football clubs in Iran
Association football clubs established in 2007
2007 establishments in Iran
Sport in Varamin